Ennur Totre (born 29 October 1996) is a Macedonian footballer who plays as a midfielder for Shkëndija and the North Macedonia national team.

Career
He started his career in 2014 with Shkëndija where he won the Macedonian First League in 2017–18, 2018–19 and 2020–21. In 2021 he moved to Tirana where he won the Kategoria Superiore in 2021–22. In August 2022 he signed for Vorskla Poltava in Ukrainian Premier League.

National Team
Totre made his international debut for North Macedonia on 14 October 2020 in the UEFA Nations League, coming on as a substitute in the 88th minute for Boban Nikolov against Georgia. The home match finished as a 1–1 draw.

Career statistics

International

Honours
Tirana
 Kategoria Superiore: (1) 2021–22

Shkëndija
 Macedonian First League: (3) 2017–18, 2018–19, 2020–21
 Macedonian Football Cup: (2) 2016, 2018

References

External links
 
 

1996 births
Living people
Sportspeople from Tetovo
Macedonian footballers
North Macedonia under-21 international footballers
North Macedonia international footballers
Association football midfielders
KF Shkëndija players
KF Tirana players
FC Vorskla Poltava players
Macedonian expatriate footballers
Expatriate footballers in Ukraine
Macedonian expatriate sportspeople in Ukraine
Macedonian First Football League players
Albanian footballers from North Macedonia